Sebastiano Ghezzi (1580–1645) was an Italian painter and architect of the Baroque period.

Biography
Born in Comunanza near Ascoli Piceno, he traveled to Bologna, where he derived instruction in design from Guercino. He however became more popular as an architect. He was named Papal engineer by Pope Urban VIII, and awarded a knighthood of the Cross. His son Giuseppe was known as a painter; his grandson, Pier Leone, has become known for his ink caricatures. Sebastiano frescoed the lunettes (1612–1613) in the cloister of S. Domenico in Ascoli, where he left a self-portrait. The frescoes are now significantly decayed. He also painted the main altar for the church of San Francesco in Comunanza.

References

Guide to Ghezzi nelle Marche.

1580 births
1645 deaths
People from the Province of Ascoli Piceno
16th-century Italian painters
Italian male painters
17th-century Italian painters
Italian Baroque painters